King Lear is a 1987 film directed by Jean-Luc Godard, an adaptation of William Shakespeare's play in the style of experimental French New Wave cinema. The script was primarily by Peter Sellars and Tom Luddy, and was originally assigned to Norman Mailer. It is not a typical cinematic adaptation of Shakespeare's eponymous tragedy, although some lines from the play are used in the film. Only three characters – Lear, Cordelia and Edgar – are common to both, and only Act I, scene 1 is given a conventional cinematic treatment in that two or three people actually engage in relatively meaningful dialogue.

King Lear is set in and around Nyon, Vaud, Switzerland, where Godard went to primary school. While many of Godard's films are concerned with the invisible aspects of cinematography, the outward action of the film is centred on William Shakespeare Junior the Fifth, who is attempting to restore his ancestor's plays in a world where most of human civilization—and more specifically culture—has been lost after the Chernobyl catastrophe.

Rather than reproducing a performance of Shakespeare's play, the film is more concerned with the issues raised by the text, and symbolically explores the relationships between power and virtue, between fathers and daughters, words and images. The film deliberately does not use conventional Hollywood filmmaking techniques which make a film 'watchable', but instead seeks to alienate and baffle its audience in the manner of Bertolt Brecht.

Cast (in order of appearance)
The film itself contains no credits or credit sequence at all, although there is a cast list on the packaging insert.
 Menahem Golan (uncredited) as himself (voice off)
 Jean-Luc Godard as himself (voice off)
 Tom Luddy (uncredited) as himself (voice off)
 Norman Mailer as himself / King Lear
 Kate Mailer as herself / Cordelia
 Peter Sellars as William Shakespeare Jr. the Fifth, a descendant of William Shakespeare
 Burgess Meredith as Don Learo
 Molly Ringwald as Cordelia
 Suzanne Lanza (uncredited) as a goblin
 Leos Carax as Edgar
 Julie Delpy as Virginia
 Jean-Luc Godard as Professor Pluggy
  (uncredited) as Journalist ("Miss Halberstadt")
 Freddy Buache as Grigori Kozintsev ("Professor Quentin")
 Woody Allen as Mr. Alien

Adaptation of the text

Script

The film script, mostly written by Peter Sellars and Tom Luddy, includes only a few of Shakespeare's lines from King Lear, and these are often fragmentary and generally not heard in the order as they appear in the play. Many of the lines are not actually spoken by the characters on-screen (i.e. diegetically), but are often heard in voice-over, or spoken by another character or voice, perhaps almost incomprehensibly, or barely whispered, repeated, echoed.

Extracts from three of Shakespeare's sonnets, numbers 47, 138 and 60 are heard during the film. There is also a single line from Hamlet: "Inside me there is a kind of fighting which will not let me sleep." (Act V, scene 2:5)

"[This] film, not at all tragic, is intellectualized and does not offer the [casual] spectator the possibility of full understanding. As the filmmaker makes clear in the film, he does not intend to give it a comprehensive treatment, since it is only an approach, a study, which is obviously partial. There is nothing definitive about the text; it is constantly interrupted, discontinuous, a disordered mix of images, a true chaos..."

Literary sources
Apart from lines from Shakespeare's play, extracts from a number of modern literary sources are also heard during the film: some are spoken by an on-screen character, some in voice-over on the deliberately confusing soundtrack. They are listed in the order in which they appear in the film.
  "Be sure..." Robert Bresson (1975). Notes sur le cinématographe.Paris: Éditions Gallimard. Folio n°2705.
  "If an image, looked at separately...": Robert Bresson, Notes sur le cinématographe.
 "I am alone," the world seems to say...": Jean Genet (1958). L'Atelier d'Alberto GiacomettiParis: Éditions Gallimard.
 "Now, even if Lansky and I are as awesome...": Albert Fried (1980). The Rise and Fall of the Jewish Gangster in America. New York: Holt, Rinehart, and Winston.
  "A violent silence for silence of Cordelia..." Viviane Forrester (1980). La violence de la calme.Paris: Editions du Seuil.
  "The image is a pure creation of the soul...": Pierre Reverdy (1918).  L'image.Revue Nord-Sud, n°13, March 1918.
  "A violent silence. The silence of Cordelia": Viviane Forrester, La violence de la calme.
 "And in me too, the wave rises, it swells, it arches its back..." Virginia Woolf (1931). The Waves.London: Hogarth Press.

Plot
"The film does not present a linear story; rather, diegetically, this nearly does not exist. It is a mass of images, texts, voices without logical sequence. It has dozens of allusions to other works and quotes from famous texts [...] Each quotation, analogy, demands from the spectator great extra-textual knowledge. It is as if Godard concentrated centuries of art and culture in this film, reviewing all of history [...] What is derived from the [play's] text are only a few characters, vaguely associated with those of Shakespeare, and some speeches totally out of context."

Synopsis
Timings are taken from the original MGM DVD.

Opening sequence 
The film begins with a sequence of extended inter-titles: 'The Cannon Group / Bahamas', 'A Picture Shot In The Back', 'King Lear / Fear and Loathing', 'King Lear / A study', 'An Approach'. A three-way telephone conversation is heard between the film's producer, Menahem Golan, Godard, and Tom Luddy. Golan complains about how long Godard is taking to make the film and insists that it must be ready for the 1987 Cannes Film Festival.

At the Hotel du Rivage in Nyon, Norman Mailer discusses his new script for King Lear with his daughter Kate Mailer, and why the characters have Mafia-like names like Don Learo, Don Gloucestro. He wants to go back to America. They sip orange juice. The whole scene is then repeated in a second take.

William Shakespeare Jr. 
William Shakespeare Junior (Will Jr.) sits at a table in the deserted hotel restaurant, overlooking Lake Geneva. There are some red tulips on the table. He wonders why he has been chosen to make this film, rather than a better-known director ("...some gentleman from Moscow or Beverly Hills. Why don't they just order some goblin to shoot this twisted fairy tale?"). In voice-over, Godard reads extracts from Robert Bresson's Notes sur le cinématographe. Will Jr. imagines 'auteurs' who could have made this film, like Marcel Pagnol, Kenji Mizoguchi, François Truffaut ("No"), Georges Franju, Robert Bresson, Pier Paulo Pasolini, Fritz Lang, Georges Melies, Jaques Tati, Jean Cocteau.

Junior wonders about Luchino Visconti (assistant to Jean Renoir), and about Auguste Renoir's attraction to young girls in later years. The name of Mr Alien is heard in voice-over with an image of Sergei Eisenstein editing on his death-bed.  Will Jr. is now in a hotel bedroom, looking at an album with images of Orson Welles, Vermeer's Girl with a Pearl Earring. Power and Virtue (inter-title) Rembrandt's Saint Paul, Rubens' Young Woman Looking Down, Rembrandt's The Return of the Prodigal Son. At the same time, in voice-over, Cordelia reads from sonnet 47: and Lear - foreshadowing the last scene of the play - mourns the death of his daughter.

Seen at a restaurant table with yellow flowers, Will Jr. explains in voice-over that he is on duty for the Cannon Cultural Division: and then there is NO THING (inter-title). Everything had disappeared after the Chernobyl explosion. Saturn Devouring His Son by Goya. After a while everything came back: electricity, houses, cars—everything except culture and William Junior. Emerging from a reed bed, he explains (in voice-over) that—by special arrangement with the Cannon Cultural Division and the Royal Library of Her Majesty, the Queen he was engaged to recover what had been lost, starting the works of his famous ancestor. In the restaurant, Will Jr. (very noisily slurping his soup) overhears Cordelia talking with a waiter. Learo interrupts, and Will Jr. realises that he is speaking lines from one of Shakespeare's lost plays. But Learo starts reminiscing about Bugsy Siegel and Meyer Lansky, two Jewish mobsters in Las Vegas. Lear reproves Cordelia for not having professed her love for him effusively enough, and says she will lose her inheritance ("You may mar your dollars"). Will Jr. goes to thank Cordelia ("my lady"), but Learo accuses him of "making a play for my girl", and silently leads her away. "Characters!"

Goblins
William Junior is seen walking in a wood. He begins writing in a notebook, silently followed by some well-dressed young people who mimic his actions. He seems not to notice them. He runs away towards someone, followed closely by the others. Will Jr. meets a man holding an elephant gun and a fishing net - Edgar, "a man poorly dressed", and Virginia (who wasn't there). Edgar says they are in Goodwater/Aubonne/Los Angeles. Will Jr. learns about Pluggy, whose "research was moving in parallel lines to my own".

Don Learo and Cordelia are in the hotel room`(00:24:05). He dictates from Fried's book while she types ("Now, even if Lansky and I are as awesome...") She is very patient. Telexes arrive from his other daughters, and Lear reads their preposterous lines from Act I, scene 1. Cordelia sinks to the floor on hearing their words: "Then poor Cordelia." NO THING. The music speeds up and sinks back to a dirge. The well-dressed young people from the woods appear on the hotel balcony. Will Jr in voice-over calls them goblins, "the secret agents of human memory."

Edgar, Will Jr. and Virginia who is picking up flowers, walk past a large red skip (00:31:13). Crow sound. Virginia picks up a white flower beside an apple tree. Express train sound. Sound of bells. Will Jr., engrossed in writing, suddenly looks up.

On the hotel balcony, a goblin, invisible to Lear, taps him on the shoulder (while Will Jr. in voice-off speaks Lear's words, wondering who he is): breaking the fourth wall, the goblin says out loud, on screen, "Lear's shadow!". In the hotel bedroom, a maid opens the french windows and two goblins enter. The man chants the words "Abracadbra! Mao Tse-tung. Che Guevara," and they disappear. The maid starts to change the bed sheets, but they are covered in blood. Will Jr. comes in, looking for Mr. Learo and stares aghast at the mess. Brief shot of Learo with Cordelia by the river in the woods.

Plato's cave
And then we are back in the half-finished house [in reality belonging to Anne-Marie Miéville]. Pluggy mutters lines from sonnet 138. Will Jr. asks Pluggy about his research. "Just what are you aiming at, Professor?" Pluggy farts loudly in Will Jr.'s direction. Virginia explains cryptically that "When the professor farts, the mountains are trembling."

Fire scene inside the house/Plato's cave. Virginia is ironing Cordelia's nightgown (she wears it in the Joan of Arc sequence at 01:07:00). NO THING (inter-title). Music starts slowly. Edgar lights a little bonfire with sticks and paper he gathered up on the way in. Will Jr: "It is born, and it is burnt. It begins from the thing it ends. At the same time." Music accelerates to nearly full speed. "Then what is it? (Looking straight at Virginia) TELL ME THE NAME! Look, no names, no lines. No lines, no story!" Virginia: "To name things makes the Professor pee." (or just 'P') Thinking with your hands ("penser avec les mains"). Edgar: "Poor things. Who are they, to need a name? To exist?" Discussion of colour. Red and yellow tulips.

Sonnet 47 in voice-over again. (00:41:15) Cordelia stands at a mirror, wiping her face clean. A maid brings a breakfast tray into the hotel apartment. Cordelia follows her unnoticed from the bathroom and watches while the maid taps on the cups and plates. (Viviane Forrester's "A violent silence for silence of Cordelia..."). Nothing. No Thing. Seagull squawk. Will Jr (in voice-over): "...But everything which conspires and organises itself around her silence, that wants to silence her silence, this produces violence." Cordelia is suddenly very aware of something, glancing round. Sudden coincidence of son+image as one of the goblins knocks her ass against the table with a crash. Another goblin, dressed like Jean-Paul Belmondo in Breathless, looks at a book. He lights her cigarette (with a lighter, like in the fire scene). But the goblins are suddenly gone, and Cordelia picks up the book: more images.

Will Jr. is sitting on the rocks and getting completely soaked by the waves. Power and Virtue (intertitle). No Thing in voice-over. Brief shot of Learo arriving at restaurant table. Edgar, walking by the river in the woods, finds an empty film can in the river. Two goblins snatch it from him. NO THING. Music speeds up.

"Snakes!" 
Pluggy's editing studio. He is photocopying his hand. Will Jr. enters.
Godard appears to have disguised one of the central aspects of his film so well that almost every writer who mentions it does so with a sense of bafflement and bewilderment: namely, the shots illuminated by a bare light bulb of toy plastic dinosaurs and other animals in a cardboard box. These shots are intercut with the montage sequence described below. At 00:48:18, we see a plastic red dinosaur and some other animals. Will Jr. asks, "What's it all for, Professor? Please?" And Pluggy replies, "The Last Judgement." Pluggy seems to be referring to the biblical passage in the Book of Revelation which describes the war in heaven. Lest we mistake the toy dinosaurs in the box, a few moments later (00:48:34) Virginia (off-screen) cries "Snakes!" The French word for 'snake' is 'serpent', the old English and French name for dragon, and the Wagnerian equivalent is 'Wurm'. Revelation, chapter 12 tells how the great red dragon is thrown down to earth, and v. 9 gives some of its names: dragon, serpent, devil, Satan. "Do not come between the dragon and his wrath," says Lear several times during the film.

One of the most famous cinematic dragons is perhaps the scene-stealing star of Part I of Die Nibelungen. The film featured in Histoire(s) du cinéma, Godard's next huge project after King Lear: "Short of fusing himself into the celluloid, Godard does what he can to immerse himself in cinema's promised immortality, bathing like Fritz Lang's Siegfried in the blood of the beast."

Montage 
"The image is a pure creation of the soul..." - Pierre Reverdy

In this highly compressed and cinematically meaningful sequence (00:49:00), Godard demonstrates the technique of montage, which allows a film-maker to bring two or more opposing realities into a new association. The scene takes place in Professor Pluggy's cutting room (or editing suite). The images (starting from 00:49:04) are:
 Henry Fuseli: Shipwreck of Odysseus.
 Unidentified image.
 Film clip of a female face in close-up.
 Giotto: The Mourning of Christ (detail). Fresco in the Scrovegni Chapel (Arena chapel), Padua.
 Film still of a notorious shot from Luis Buñuel's  Un chien andalou.
 Fuseli: Lady Macbeth Sleepwalking
 The front cover (detail) of Tex Avery by Patrick Brion, published in France in 1986 while King Lear was still in production. It shows a reversed still shot of the wolf from Tex Avery's 1949 cartoon Little Rural Riding Hood.
 Unidentified painting of a young man kissing a reclining woman's neck.

Cordelia is seen lying on her bed, wearing the nightgown which Virginia was ironing, with the book of Doré pictures. Goya's Judith and Holofernes, illuminated by a candle flame (00:50:43) Another shot of the animals in the cardboard box. Brief shots of what seems to be a cinema audience in silhouette. The shadowy figure standing beside the editing monitors lights a sparkler and turns out to be Edgar. Pluggy asks him if he has finished "our construction" yet. Edgar hands the sparkler ('cierge magique' in French, lit. 'magic candle') to Will Jr., and goes off to ask Virginia. "Let's go," says Pluggy, and Will Jr. asks if he can bring some friends.

In the restaurant in the evening, Learo gets angry with Will Jr., while Cordelia buries her head in her hands. Shot of a white horse. Will Jr. (off-screen) reads more Forrester. Learo buries his head in his hands. Will Jr. gives Cordelia a sparkler. Learo talks about "God's spies". Cut to the earlier daytime shots of Will Jr. in the restaurant, reflecting on his inability to control his characters (or actors?), and how Lear and Cordelia respectively represent Power and Virtue.

A Picture Shot In The Back (intertitle). In a small cinema or screening room (00:59:50). A journalist from The New York Times asks Pluggy about his new invention. Professor Kozintsev arrives. Pluggy asks him, "Really? You found it, really?" "It all just happened by chance," Kozintsev replies, "in King Solomon's Mines." Discussion of cinema. An empty cinema/screening room. Learo and Cordelia enter, and Will Jr. goes to sit between them. "Peace, Mr. Shakespeare. Come not between the dragon and his wrath," says Learo. Will goes to sit somewhere else, and his chair tips up. On the soundtrack we hear a scene from Kozintsev's King Lear.

Back again in the hotel bedroom Cordelia, wearing her nightgown, acts the part of The Maid of Orléans in a remake of a scene from Robert Bresson's 1962 film The Trial of Joan of Arc. The goblins diegetically speak the lines of Joan's inquisitors.

Endings
We see a copy of Woolf's The Waves lying on the pebbles by the lake. Inter-titles: 'King Lear / A Clearing'. On the soundtrack we hear the noise of an express train passing at speed. Intertitle: 'NO THING'. Clear, joyous birdsong. Easter bells. The first image. Winding back time to zero. J. S. Bach, St. Matthew Passion, opening chorus.  Bells. Pluggy lying on the ground, moribund, surrounded by flowers. Will Jr.: "Now I understand that Pluggy's sacrifice was not in vain." "Now I understood through his work the words of St. Paul: 'The image will re-appear at the time of resurrection.'"

Will Junior is seen lying on the ground, as if dead. Shot of the empty film can which Edgar fished out of the river earlier. Edgar spools up some film. Edgar exits left, pursued by a bear Will Jr. with an elephant gun.
	 
By the lake (01:17:00). All five main characters (Virginia, Edgar, Lear, Cordelia, and William Junior) together for the only time in the film. "The dawn of our first image" coinciding with shot of a white horse. The final paragraph of The Waves is heard (01:19:50). The goblins, yelling and uttering wild cries, pursue Learo who now carries the elephant gun himself, pushing and shoving him as he walks towards Cordelia leading the horse. Cordelia is seen on the rocks, Learo with the gun, facing away from camera. Another shot in the back, like many of Godard's images. How does Cordelia die? No shot is heard.

Mr. Alien's editing studio. Mr Alien stitches the film together with needle and thread. He reads Shakespeare sonnet 60 (01:24:50). Shot of the white horse again in slo-mo. Lear's final lines read by Ruth Maleczech and recorded by Peter Sellers (along with David Warrilow) in Philip Glass's studio in New York. A STUDY (inter-title). Seagull/crow squawk. End.

Soundtrack
"Hide the ideas, but so that people find them. The most important will be the most hidden."

Shakespeare's original play is full of lines containing animal imagery. In King Lear Godard fills the soundtrack with a barrage of semi-identifiable animal noises: one of the most noticeable is the shrill and raucous call of a crow. This is a recurring sound in Godard's films, including Allemagne année 90 neuf zéro and JLG/JLG. A detail of Wheatfield with Crows, one of Vincent van Gogh's very last paintings, appears towards the end of King Lear. Discussing JLG/JLG, Nora M. Alter remarks: "Not only is the crow conspicuously absent on the screen, but its sounds are conspicuously disjunct, too loud to be part of the landscape. This sequence, sometimes with the muttering voice of the narrator superimposed, is repeated at irregular intervals[...] I want to suggest that, consistent with much of Godard's work, [this sequence] does not hierarchize the aural and the visual. On the contrary, it fuses the two together as a sound image, or rebus..."

In many of Godard's films, the aural and the visual are conceived to be perceived as one, a son+image (sound+picture). This is a type of audio-visual collage made up of overlapping or repeated film clips, written or spoken poetry, philosophy, high and low literature, as well as paintings and visual citations, which function as a rebus. Godard's later films break the conventions that film dialogue should generally  be audible and meaningful and progress the plot. Although King Lear uses Dolby stereo to good effect, vision and sound often do not complement each other, with the effect of making viewers continually question what they are seeing or hearing.

Music
The music exemplifies two of Bresson's aphorisms in Notes sur le cinématographe: "No music as accompaniment, support or reinforcement. No music at all. (Except, of course, the music played by visible instruments)"; and "The noises must become music."

Although barely recognisable, much of the music is taken from Beethoven's last completed work, the String Quartet No. 16, Op. 135. Ever since Godard's 1963 short film Le Nouveau Monde, Beethoven's Große Fuge and final quartet had provided a lasting challenge to the moral compromises and the empty banalities of the moment. In King Lear, Godard slowed the music down and electronically manipulated it so that the only easily identifiable extract is from the second movement (in 3/4 time, from around bar 120). At the very start of the film the music is heard playing at about half speed, but most of the time it is played back even slower as a low background dirge. The passage only reaches the proper pitch two or three times, with a swift accelerando at crucial moments of NO THING and then collapses again as swiftly: when Cordelia sinks down on the balcony with Learo (wearing red) uncomfortably close behind her (00:30:40), and when the goblins snatch the empty film can from Edgar's hands beside the river (00:46:50).

The opening chorus of J. S. Bach's St. Matthew Passion is heard during the reversed stop-motion sequence of "creating" the flowers (01:13:05), and at the death of Professor Pluggy (01:14:20), similarly slowed down.

Judith Wilt prefaced her article on Virginia Woolf's The Waves with this passage from Moments of Being: 
"From this I reach what I might call a philosophy ... that the whole world is a work of art. ... Hamlet, or a Beethoven quartet is the truth about this vast mass that we call the world. But there is no Shakespeare, there is no Beethoven; certainly and emphatically there is no God; we are the words; we are the music; we are the thing itself."

Production
Although Norman Mailer had written a complete script, Godard didn't use it. Mailer & his daughter, Kate Mailer, arrived in Nyon in September 1986 and did around three hours' shooting. He was paid $500,000. The scene with Woody Allen was shot at his editing suite in the Brill Building, Manhattan in January 1987. The main shoot took place in Switzerland in March 1987 in Nyon and Rolle, a few kilometers apart. Godard had also accepted a contract to make some short commercial films for Closed, a brand of jeans by Marithé and François Girbaud. These commercial videos were shot in March 1987 at the same time as King Lear, and the same actors/models in the commercials also appear in the film as the goblins. ""What sets me apart from lots of people in the cinema," Godard has said, "is that money is part of the screenplay, in the story of the film, and that the film is part of money, like mother-child, father-daughter." The ads use similar locations and a similar montage technique, and the titles some of the jeans ads make the connections obvious: Tulipes, Fer a repasser (Ironing, lit. 'Smoothing iron') and King Lear. One of the shots (the models/goblins climbing over the hotel balcony railing) is used in both the commercial and the main film of King Lear.

Release
King Lear premiered at Cannes on May 17, 1987, and, after a brief two-week run in the US, it did not appear in cinemas for another fifteen years. It was re-released in 2002 by French distributor Bodega Films, but the company and Godard were sued by Viviane Forrester, the author of one of the literary quotations used in the film, for infringing her copyright. Godard and Bodega were both fined €5,000 and King Lear was withdrawn after two years.

Metro-Goldwyn-Mayer released a DVD for the Italian market only, with unintelligible subtitles which are often only a vague approximation of some of the lines and names mentioned in the film. The DVD seems to have been generally available since 2013, possibly after Roger Ebert's mention of it on his website.

Reception
The film has an approval rating of 55% on the ratings aggregator Rotten Tomatoes, based on 11 reviews, with an average score of 4.80/10.

Desson Howe of the Washington Post criticised Godard for inappropriately imposing his unique style on Shakespeare's work - "Where the playwright values clarity and poetry, Godard seems to go for obfuscation and banality. Shakespeare aims for universality, while Godard seeks to devalue everything." - whilst reserving praise for the editing and cinematography. Also from The Washington Post, Hal Hinson classified the film as a "labored, not terribly funny practical joke", "infuriating, baffling, challenging and fascinating" in which Godard "trashes his own talent".

The New York Times review by Vincent Canby in 1988 compared it unfavourably to the rest of Godard's oeuvre as "tired, familiar and out of date", remarking that the few lines of Shakespeare delivered in the play overpower his dialogue, making it "seem much punier than need be". Nonetheless, Canby praises the acting as "remarkably good under terrible circumstances". Canby also called the film "sad and embarrassing" and was quoted by Keith Harrison in the introduction to his Bakhtinian Polyphony in Godard's King Lear. Harrison cites the critical responses of Peter S. Donaldson, Alan Walworth and Anthony R. Guneratne for their sustained coherence of analysis of King Lear, and discusses the film in terms of Mikhail Bakhtin's interrelated concepts of dialogism, the carnivalesque, heteroglossia, the chronotope, co-authoring, polyglossia, inter-illumination, refraction, unfinalizability, and polyphony, to show that "Godard's autobiographical and densely fragmented re-creation of Shakespeare's King Lear is carefully shaped, meaningful, and, ultimately, compelling in its multi-voiced unity."

Conversely, Kevin Thomas of the Los Angeles Times called it, "a work of certified genius", and Richard Brody, writing in The New Yorker in 2012, wrote: "In this year’s Sight & Sound poll, I named it the greatest film of all time." He confirmed this opinion about the adaptation in 2014. Comparing it with Godard's In Praise of Love in 2017, Brody said that they are "great films that are even more aesthetically radical than his earlier ones".

See also
Uroboros
Self-reference

Notes and references

Notes

References

Sources

 
 
 
 
  Part 1, pp. 1-41·Part 2, pp. 44-77·Part 3, pp. 78-107. Retrieved 23 November 2022.

 
 
 
 
 
 
 
 
 
 
 
  NB hefty subscription needed

External links

"Godard's 'King Lear' at Twenty-Five" from The New Yorker
King Lear at MUBI
"Criminally Underrated: King Lear" by Jake Cole. Spectrum Culture. Retrieved 23 November 2022.

1987 films
1987 drama films
1980s avant-garde and experimental films
1980s English-language films
American drama films
American alternate history films
American avant-garde and experimental films
Films directed by Jean-Luc Godard
Films based on King Lear
Films set in Switzerland
Films shot in Switzerland
Golan-Globus films
Films produced by Menahem Golan
Films produced by Yoram Globus
1980s American films